Neo-Tech or Neo Tech may refer to:
 Neo-Tech Publishing Company, now known as Integrated Management Associates
 Neo-Tech (philosophy), a philosophy promoted by Frank R. Wallace
 Neo Tech, a variant of the Neo Sans typeface
Neotech, game produced by Neogames